General Ramírez is a village and municipality in Entre Ríos Province in north-eastern Argentina. General Ramírez may also refer to:

Francisco Ramírez (governor) (1786–1821), Argentine general governing Entre Ríos during the Argentine War of Independence
José Santos Ramírez (c. 1790–1851), Argentine general in the Argentine Civil Wars
Juan Sánchez Ramírez (1762–1811), captain general of the Dominican Republic
Pedro Pablo Ramírez (1884–1962), Argentine general who became president in a coup
Victoriano Ramírez (1888–1929), Mexican Army general in the Cristero War